Canadian roller derby leagues at one point were welcomed to join the Canadian Women's Flat Track Roller Derby Association, which in January 2012 renamed itself the Roller Derby Association of Canada. The Toronto Roller Derby League is the largest flat-track derby league in Canada. Many roller derby leagues enjoy support from their national skate federations, including  Roller Sports Canada.

Contemporary roller derby has a basic set of rules, with variations reflecting the interests of a governing body's member leagues. The Women's Flat Track Derby Association (WFTDA) rules are used by the majority of leagues around the world. Members of the Roller Derby Association of Canada have been encouraged to join the WFTDA.

Leagues
 Abbotsford, British Columbia – Reign Valley Vixens
Airdrie, Alberta - Rockyview Rollers
 Alliston, Ontario – Renegade Derby Dames
 Brantford, Ontario – Belle City Roller Girls
 Barrie, Ontario – South Simcoe Rebel Rollers
 Calgary, Alberta – Calgary Roller Derby Association
 Calgary, Alberta - Chinook City Roller Derby League
 Chilliwack, British Columbia – Voodoo Derby Dollz Roller Derby Association
 Cold Lake and Bonnyville, Alberta – Lakeland Ladykillers Roller Derby League
 Edmonton, Alberta – E-Ville Roller Derby
 Edmonton, Alberta – Oil City Derby Girls
 Fredericton, New Brunswick – Capital City Rollers
 Halifax, Nova Scotia – Anchor City Rollers
 Hamilton, Ontario – Hammer City Roller Derby
 Kelowna, British Columbia – (see Okanagan Roller Derby Girls)
 Kamloops, British Columbia – (see Tournament City Derby Dolls)
 Kitchener-Waterloo Area, Ontario – Tri-City Roller Derby
 Kingston, Ontario – Limestone CrusHers Roller Derby
 Kingston, Ontario – Kingston Derby Girls
 Guelph, Ontario – Royal City Roller Derby
 Lacombe, Alberta - Central Alberta Roller Derby
 London, Ontario – Forest City Derby Girls
 London, Ontario – LOCO Roller Derby
 Medicine Hat, Alberta – Gas City Rollers
 Moncton, New Brunswick – Muddy River Rollers
 Montreal, Quebec – Montreal Roller Derby
 Okanagan, British Columbia – Okanagan Roller Derby Girls (Kelowna Peach Tarts)
 Okanagan/Shuswap, British Columbia – Okanagan Shuswap Roller Derby
 Ottawa, Ontario – Ottawa Roller Derby
 Ottawa, Ontario – Ottawa Valley Roller Derby
 PEI - Red Rock 'n' Roller Derby 
 Prince George, British Columbia – Rated PG Rollergirls
 Quebec City, Quebec – Roller Derby Québec
 Red Deer, Alberta – Red Deer Roller Derby Association
 Regina, Saskatchewan – Queen City Roller Sports, Pile O' Bones Derby Club
 Saint John, New Brunswick – Fog City Rollers
 Saskatoon, Saskatchewan – Saskatoon Roller Derby League
 St. Albert, Alberta – St. Albert Heavenly Rollers
 St. Catharines, Ontario - Niagara Roller Girls
 St. John's, Newfoundland – 709 Roller Derby (2010 – present)
 Sudbury, Ontario – Nickel City Roller Derby
 Stratford, Ontario – LOCO Roller Derby
 Sunshine Coast, British Columbia – Sunshine Coast Roller Girls
 Toronto, Ontario – Toronto Junior Roller Derby
 Toronto, Ontario – Hogtown Roller Derby
 Toronto, Ontario – Toronto Roller Derby
 Toronto, Ontario – Toronto LOCO Roller Derby
 Vancouver, British Columbia – Terminal City Roller Girls
 Victoria, British Columbia – Victoria Rollergirls
 Victoria, British Columbia – Eves of Destruction
 West Kootenays, British Columbia – West Kootenay Roller Derby
 Wetaskiwin, Alberta – Rez City Rollers
 Whitehorse, Yukon – Yukon Roller Girls (2010–present)
 Williams Lake, British Columbia – Lake City Derby Girls
 Winnipeg, Manitoba – Winnipeg Roller Derby League

See also

 Roller derby

References

 
Roller derby
Canada